Charles Clayton Grove (1875–?) was an American mathematician who studied the Hesse group and the Hesse pencil.

References

20th-century American mathematicians